Nana Asmaʾu  (full name: Asmaʾu bint Shehu Usman dan Fodiyo, ; 1793–1864) was a Fula princess, poet, teacher, and a daughter of the founder of the Sokoto Caliphate, Usman dan Fodio.  She remains a revered figure in northern Nigeria. She is held up by some as an example of education and independence of women possible under Islam, and by others as a precursor to modern feminism in Africa.

Biography
Nana Asmaʾu was born in 1793 and named after Asmāʾ bint Abi Bakr, a Companion of Muhammad. In her childhood she lived through the Fulani War (1804–08), a campaign of jihad which established the powerful Sokoto Caliphate, an Islamic empire. The daughter of the Caliphate's founder Usman dan Fodio (1754–1817) and half-sister of its second Sultan, Muhammed Bello (died 1837), she outlived most of the founding generation of the Caliphate and was an important source of guidance to its later rulers. From 1805, members of the Caliph's family came to great prominence, including the Caliph's female relatives. While Nana Asmaʾu became the most prominent, her sisters Maryam and Fatima, and the Caliph's wives Aisha and Hawwaʾu, played major literary and political roles in the new state.

Like her father, Nana Asmaʾu was educated in tafsir (Qur'anic studies), and placed a high value upon universal education. As exemplars of the Qadiriyya sufis, dan Fodio and his followers stressed the sharing of knowledge, especially that of the sunnah, the example of the prophet Muhammad. To learn without teaching, they thought, was sterile and empty.  Thus Nana Asmaʾu was devoted, in particular, to the education of women. Like most of the rest of her family, she became a prolific author.

Writer and counsellor
Well educated in the classics of the Arab and Classical world, and well versed in four languages, Arabic, Fula, Hausa and Tamacheq Tuareg. Nana Asmaʾu had a public reputation as a leading scholar in the most influential Muslim state in West Africa, which gave her the opportunity to correspond broadly. She witnessed many of the wars of the Fulani War and wrote about her experiences in the prose narrative Wakar Gewaye, "The Song of Wandering".

As the Sokoto Caliphate began as a cultural and religious revolutionary movement, the writings of its leaders held a special place by which later generations, both rulers and ruled, could measure their society. She became a counsellor to her brother when he took the Caliphate, and he also recorded writing instructions to governors, debating with the scholars of foreign princes.

Poet
Among her more than 60 surviving works written over 40 years, Nana Asmaʾu left behind a large body of poetry in Arabic, the Fula language, and Hausa, all written in the Arabic script. Many of these are historical narratives, but they also include elegies, laments, and admonitions. Her poems of guidance became tools for teaching the founding principles of the Caliphate. Asmaʾu also collaborated closely with Muhammed Bello, the second Caliph. Her works include and expand upon the dan Fodio's strong emphasis on women leaders and women's rights within the community ideals of the Sunnah and Islamic law.

Women's education
The surviving written works by Asmaʾu are related to Islamic education. For much of her adult life, she was responsible for women's religious education. Starting around 1830, she created a cadre of women teachers called jajiss, who travelled throughout the Caliphate educating women in the students' homes. In turn, each of these jajis used the writings of Nana Asmaʾu and other Sufi scholars, usually through recited mnemonics and poetry, to train crops of learned women called the ƴan-taru, or "those who congregate together, the sisterhood." To each jaji she bestowed a malfa, a hat and traditional ceremonial symbol of office of the Hausa animist priestesses in Gobir, tied with a red turban. The jajis thus became symbols of the new state, the new order, and of Islamic learning even outside women's communities.

In part, this educational project began as a way to integrate newly conquered pagan captives into a Muslim ruling class.  It expanded, however, to include the poor and rural, training teachers who travelled across the sprawling Caliphate.

Contemporary legacy
Nana Asmaʾu's continued legacy rests not just on her literary work, but also on her role in defining the values of the Sokoto state. Today in Northern Nigeria, Islamic women's organisations, schools, and meeting halls are commonly named for her.  She re-entered the debate on the role of women in Islam in the 20th century, as her legacy has been carried by Islamic scholars and immigrants to Europe and its academic debates.

The republishing and translation of her works has brought added attention to the purely literary value of her prose and poems. She is the subject of several studies, including Jean Boyd's The Caliph's Sister: Nana Asma'u 1793–1865: Teacher, Poet and Islamic Leader (1989), described as an "important book" that "provides a good read for the nonspecialist willing to discard common stereotypes about women in Africa", and One Woman's Jihad: Nana Asma'u, Scholar and Scribe by Beverly B. Mack and Jean Boyd (2000). The Collected Works of Nana Asma'u, Daughter of Usman dan Fodiyo 1793–1864, edited by Boyd and Mack, was published in 1997. An extract from Nana Asma'u's "Lamentation for 'Aysha II" is included in the 2019 anthology New Daughters of Africa, edited by Margaret Busby.

In 2019, Governor Aminu Waziri Tambuwal of Sokoto state directed the state ministry of lands and housing to provide suitable land for the immediate take-off of the Nana Asmaʾu University of Medical Sciences in Sokoto, to be established by the Sultan foundation.

See also

Women in Islam
Usman dan Fodio

Further reading
 Chukwuma Azuonye, "Feminist or Simply Feminine? Reflections on the Works of Nana Asmā'u, a Nineteenth-Century West African Woman Poet, Intellectual, and Social Activist", Meridians, Vol. 6, No. 2, Women, Creativity, and Dissidence (2006), pp. 54–77.
 Jean Boyd, The Caliph's Sister: Nana Asma'u 1793–1865: Teacher, Poet, and Islamic Leader. London: Frank Cass & Co, 1989, . 
 Jean Boyd. "Distance Learning from Purdah in Nineteenth-Century Northern Nigeria: The Work of Asma'u Fodiyo". Journal of African Cultural Studies, Vol. 14, No. 1, Islamic Religious Poetry in Africa (June 2001), pp. 7–22.
 Jean Boyd, "West Africa", in Suad Joseph, Afsaneh Najmabadi (eds), Encyclopedia of Women & Islamic Cultures, New York: Brill Publishers, 2003, pp. 327–29; .
Jean Boyd and Beverly B. Mack (eds), The Collected Works of Nana Asma’u, Daughter of Usman dan Fodiyo 1793–1864, East Lansing, Michigan: Michigan State University Press, 1997.
 Jean Boyd and Beverly B. Mack, Educating Muslim Women: The West African Legacy of Nana Asma'u, 1793–1864, Kube Publishing, Interface Publications, 2013. .
 Jean Boyd and Murray Last. "The Role of Women as 'Agents Religieux' in Sokoto", Canadian Journal of African Studies/Revue Canadienne des Études Africaines, Vol. 19, No. 2 (1985), pp. 283–300.
Beverly B. Mack and Jean Boyd, One Woman's Jihad: Nana Asma’u, Scholar and Scribe, Bloomington, Indiana: Indiana University Press, 2000. .
 Margaret Hauwa Kassam. "Some Aspects of Women's Voices from Northern Nigeria", African Languages and Cultures, Vol. 9, No. 2, Gender and Popular Culture (1996), pp. 111–25.
 Aisha R. Masterton, One Woman's Jihad: Nana Asma'u, Scholar and Scribe – book review. African Arts, Winter 2001.
 Katja Werthmann, "The example of Nana Asma’u", D+C: Development & Cooperation, InWEnt gGmbH, No.03, 2005.
 Muhammad Jameel Yusha'u, "Nana Asma'u Tradition: An Intellectual Movement and a Symbol of Women Rights in Islam During the 19th Century DanFodio's Islamic Reform". Department of Mass Communications, Bayero University, Kano. Paper Presented at the Conference on Sokoto Jihad organized by the Centre for Hausa Cultural Studies, Kano, at the Murtala Muhammad Library, 7–8 June 2004.

References

External links
 ER, "Nana Asma’u", Naked History, 28 March 2017.
 KeriLynn Engel, "Nana Asma’u: princess, poet, reformer of Muslim women’s education", Amazing Women in History, 4 December 2011.

1793 births
1864 deaths
18th-century Nigerian people
19th-century Arabic poets
19th-century Nigerian women
19th-century Nigerian women writers
19th-century Nigerian writers
Dan Fodio family
Female Islamic religious leaders
Nigerian Arabic poets
Nigerian feminists
Nigerian Fula people
Nigerian Muslims
Nigerian philosophers
Nigerian women philosophers
Nigerian princesses
Nigerian royalty
Nigerian Sufis
Nigerian women poets
History of women in Nigeria
Sokoto Caliphate
Sufi poets
Women scholars of Islam